William Vincent may refer to:

 William Vincent (priest) (1739–1815), Dean of Westminster
 William Vincent (MP) (1615–1661), English merchant and politician
 William D. Vincent (1852–1922), U.S. Representative from Kansas
 William Edward Vincent (1823–1861), New Zealand printer, publisher and publican
 William Henry Hoare Vincent (1866–1941), Welsh civil servant and diplomat
 Shadows and Lies, also known as William Vincent, a 2010 romantic drama film
 William Vincent Ltd., a British coachbuilder founded in 1805
 Bill Vincent (born 1957), New Zealand judoka

See also 
 

Vincent, William